The William C. Morris YA Debut Award is an annual award given to a work of young adult literature by a "first-time author writing for teens". It is administered by the Young Adult Library Services Association (YALSA), a division of the American Library Association (ALA). It was named for twentieth-century American publisher William C. Morris (born 1928 or 1929 and raised up in Eagle Pass, Texas, died Sept 28, 2003 in Manhattan), whom YALSA calls an innovator and "an influential innovator in the publishing world and an advocate for marketing books for children and young adults".

The award is funded by the William C. Morris Endowment, established in 2000 and activated in 2003 with a bequest of $400,000 from the Morris estate. Morris gave the money to ALA to fund programs, publications, events, or awards in promotion of children's literature. In addition to being a member of ALA, Morris was the first recipient of its Distinguished Service Award in 1992. The shortlist for the first award was announced on December 8, 2008, and the winner, A Curse Dark as Gold by Elizabeth C. Bunce, was announced on January 26, 2009, at the ALA's midwinter meeting.

"To be eligible, a title must have been designated by its publisher as being either a young adult book or one published for the age range that YALSA defines as 'young adult', i.e., 12 through 18". About 4000 "YA titles" are published annually and about 10% may be debuts.

Recipients

Notes

References

Awards established in 2009
Young adult literature awards
American Library Association awards
English-language literary awards